Events from the year 2019 in Northern Ireland.

Incumbents 
First minister of Northern Ireland – Vacant
deputy first minister of Northern Ireland – Vacant
Secretary of state for Northern Ireland – Karen Bradley (until 24 July), Julian Smith (from 24 July)

Events 
 19 January – car bomb attack at a courthouse in Derry, for which the New IRA are the "main line of enquiry".
 2 May – Elections in all 11 councils in Northern Ireland.
12 December – Northern Ireland's 18 seats in the British House of Commons are contested in the 2019 United Kingdom general election. The results are DUP 8 seats (down 1), Sinn Féin 7 seats (no change), SDLP 2 seats (up 2), and Alliance Party 1 one seat (up 1).

Sport 
 July – The Open Championship (golf) held at Royal Portrush Golf Club; winner: Shane Lowry.

Deaths 
 21 January – Padraic Fiacc, poet, (born 1924)
 10 February – Sam McCready, actor, theatre director and playwright, (born 1936)
 18 April – Lyra McKee, journalist (born 1990)

References

 
Northern Ireland